Karakuş (lit. 'black bird') is a Turkish surname. Notable people with the surname include:

 Ayhan Karakuş (born 1989), Turkish wrestler
 Hamit Karakus, Dutch politician

See also
 Karakuş Tumulus, an ancient mausoleum
 Karakuş Han, a Turkic god of birds
 Qaraqush (disambiguation)

Turkish-language surnames